Aluminaut (built in 1964) was the world's first aluminum submarine. An experimental vessel, the 80-ton,  crewed deep-ocean research submersible was built by Reynolds Metals Company, which was seeking to promote the utility of aluminum. Aluminaut was based in Miami, Florida, and was operated from 1964 to 1970 by Reynolds Submarine Services, doing contract work for the U.S. Navy and other organizations, including marine biologist Jacques Cousteau.

Aluminaut is best known for helping recover a lost unarmed U.S. hydrogen bomb in 1966 and recovering its smaller fellow deep-submergence vehicle, DSV Alvin in 1969, after Alvin had been lost and sank in the Atlantic Ocean the previous year. After retirement, Aluminaut was donated to the Science Museum of Virginia in Richmond, where it is on permanent display.

1964: World's first aluminum submarine
Reynolds Metals was an early developer and manufacturer of aluminum products, including aluminum buses and other aluminum motor vehicles.

Reynolds Metals designed and built the Aluminaut as an experiment. The concept of an aluminum submarine was developed at Reynolds during World War II in 1942 by executive vice president Julian "Louis" Reynolds, a son of the founder. Louis Reynolds led the foil division, which accounted for 65% of the company's sales before the war. Reynolds Metals played an active role in the U.S. war effort, but it was 20 years before the aluminum submarine was built.

In 1964, Reynolds had the Electric Boat Division of General Dynamics in Groton, Connecticut, build the world's first aluminum submarine. The submersible was operated by subsidiary Reynolds Submarine Services Corporation, based in Miami, Florida. Compared to many deep-sea vessels, Aluminaut was large. It weighed 80 tons and could accommodate a crew of three and three to four scientists.

For flexibility, it was outfitted for many types of oceanographic and salvage missions. In September 1964, Time magazine reported on the vehicle's unique specifications, stating that its  hull consists of 11 forged cylinders.

The Aluminaut was designed at the Woods Hole Oceanographic Institution in Woods Hole, Massachusetts. A full-scale wooden mock-up was built to engineer the interior spaces. The project was classified as top-secret at that time. At that time it did not have a conning tower entry and it immediately flooded and sank. The tower entry was designed and added and in the first test, the submarine turned upside down. It was thought at that time that the design was impractical and was almost scrapped.

A one-sixteenth scale model of the final design was built in 1960 and run through stability and pressure tests.

1966: Helping recover a lost unarmed atomic bomb

      
The Aluminaut soon became useful during an incident with potentially major implications. On January 17, 1966, a 1.45-megaton-of-TNT equivalent thermonuclear bomb (Teller–Ulam design) was lost in the Mediterranean Sea during a United States Air Force collision over Palomares, Spain.

Seven crew members were killed in the mid-air crash of a B-52 bomber and a KC-135 refueling plane. The crash dropped three thermonuclear bombs on the land, and one in the sea. Although the others were quickly located, the bomb which had fallen into the ocean could not be located promptly.

The U.S. Navy responded to the coast off Spain with an 18-ship, 2,200-man recovery task force under Admiral William S. "Wild Bill" Guest. In addition to military ships, the civilian-crewed Aluminaut and deep-sea submersible Alvin were both used to respond to this urgent situation as part of the task force, along with other specialized equipment. Once on site, Aluminaut and Alvin searched the ocean depths to locate and recover the submerged bomb. For eighty days the search went on, straining the U.S. relationship with Spain, and giving Soviet propagandists what Time magazine described as "a rich fallout of anti-American gibes".

Admiral Guest allowed it to be photographed by the news media, allowing the world at large its first peek at a thermonuclear bomb as it sat secured on the fantail of the  submarine rescue ship USS Petrel.

1969: Rescuing DSV Alvin

Although both were put into service in 1964, the smaller Alvin was to have a much longer life. As of 2017, the Alvin is still in active service, operated by the Woods Hole Oceanographic Institution.  Yet Aluminaut proved vital to Alvin in 1969.

In October 1968, Alvin was being transported aboard the Woods Hole Oceanographic Institution tender ship Lulu. Lulu was a vessel created from a pair of decommissioned U.S. Navy pontoon boats with a support structure. While Alvin was being lowered over the side of Lulu on October 16, 1968, two steel cables snapped with three crew members aboard and the hatch open. Situated between the pontoons with no deck underneath, Alvin entered the water and rapidly  began to sink.

In September 1969, Aluminaut was used to secure lines and a net to the Alvin, which was located, intact, almost a mile beneath the surface.  Alvin was then hauled to the surface by USS Mizar. Lunches left aboard Alvin were found to be soggy but edible, a fact which was tested when a preserved cheese sandwich was nibbled upon by one of the crew. This incident led to a more comprehensive understanding that near-freezing temperatures and the lack of decaying oxygen at depth aided preservation. Alvin required a major overhaul after the incident.

Other missions
Aluminaut did other work for the U.S. Navy, recovering a  current array torpedo at the Navy's acoustic testing facility in the Bahamas. It helped make films for Jacques Cousteau and Ivan Tors Studios.

Retirement
The Aluminaut was retired in 1970. It was donated by Reynolds Metals Company to the Science Museum of Virginia in Richmond, Virginia, where it is on display. However, the submersible continues to be maintained in case it needs to be returned to active service.

See also

References

External links 
 "Aluminaut & Aquanauts". Time. September 11, 1964.

Deep-submergence vehicles
Maritime incidents in 1968
Museum ships in Virginia
Museums in Richmond, Virginia
1964 ships